Atalia Union is a union parishad in Dumuria Upazila of Khulna District, in Khulna Division, Bangladesh.

References

Unions of Dumuria Upazila
Populated places in Khulna District